Leo Adraa is a football coach and former football player from Uganda.

South Sudan

Winning the South Sudan domestic league with Atlabara FC, Adraa would lead the club to the 2014 CAF Champions League, the first time a South Sudanese club would compete in the competition.

Appointed caretaker  coach of the South Sudan national team in 2016, the Ugandan was to lead the squad for the two remaining 2017 Africa Cup of Nations qualifiers; however, he resigned from the position after one match that year because of the football associations's negligence towards his salary, citing unpaid wages. Adraa has stated he would never return to South Sudan again.

References 

Living people
Uganda international footballers
Ugandan football managers
Expatriate football managers in South Sudan
Uganda national football team managers
South Sudan national football team managers
Ugandan footballers
Association footballers not categorized by position
Year of birth missing (living people)